Madhuca longifolia is an Indian tropical tree found largely in the central, southern, north Indian plains and forests, Nepal, Myanmar and Sri Lanka. It is commonly known as madhūka, mahuwa, Butter Tree, mahua, mahwa, Iluppai , Mee or vippa chettu. It is a fast-growing tree that grows to approximately 20 meters in height, possesses evergreen or semi-evergreen foliage, and belongs to the family Sapotaceae. It is adaptable to arid environments, being a prominent tree in tropical mixed deciduous forests in India in the states of Odisha, Chhattisgarh, Jharkhand, Uttar Pradesh, Bihar, Maharashtra, Andhra Pradesh, Madhya Pradesh, Kerala, Gujarat, West Bengal and Tamil Nadu.

Uses
It is cultivated in warm and humid regions for its oleaginous seeds (producing between 20 and 200 kg of seeds annually per tree, depending on maturity), flowers and wood. The fat (solid at ambient temperature) is used for the care of the skin, to manufacture soap or detergents, and as a vegetable butter. It can also be used as a fuel oil. The seed cakes obtained after extraction of oil constitute very good fertilizer. The flowers are used to produce an alcoholic drink in tropical India. This drink is also known to affect animals. Several parts of the tree, including the bark, are used for their medicinal properties. It is considered holy by many tribal communities because of its usefulness. 

The leaves of Madhuca indica (= M. longifolia) are fed on by the moth Antheraea paphia, which produces tassar silk, a form of wild silk of commercial importance in India. Leaves, flowers and fruits are also lopped to feed goats and sheep.

The Tamils have several uses for M. longifolia (iluppai in Tamil). The saying "aalai illaa oorukku iluppaip poo charkkarai" indicates when there is no cane sugar available, the flower of M. longifolia can be used, as it is very sweet. However, Tamil tradition cautions that excessive use of this flower will result in imbalance of thinking and may even lead to lunacy.

The alkaloids in the press cake of mahua seeds is reportedly used in killing fishes in aquaculture ponds in some parts of India. The cake serves to fertilise the pond, which can be drained, sun dried, refilled with water and restocked with fish fingerlings.

Mahua Flowers

The mahua flower is edible and is a food item for tribals. They use it to make syrup for medicinal purposes.

Mahua flowers are rich in total sugars, out of which reducing sugar are present in high amount. The flowers are also fermented to produce the alcoholic drink mahua, a country liquor. Tribals of Surguja and Bastar in Chhattisgarh and peoples of Western Orissa, Santhals of Santhal Paraganas (Jharkhand), Koya tribals of North-East Andhra Pradesh, Bhil tribals in western Madhya Pradesh and tribals of North Maharashtra consider the tree and the mahua drink as part of their cultural heritage. Mahua is an essential drink for tribal men and women during celebrations.

Mahua fruit are an essential food of Western Odisha people. The tree has a great cultural significance. There are many varieties of food prepared with its fruits and flowers. Also, Western Odisha people used to pray to this tree during festivals. The liquor produced from the flowers is largely colourless, opaque and not very strong. It is inexpensive and the production is largely done in home stills.

Mahua flowers are also used to manufacture jam, which is made by tribal co-operatives in the Gadchiroli district of Maharashtra.

Apart from that there is another company located in Wardha district of Maharashtra," Sevagram Agro Industries" who are dealing in Mahua products at very large scale and exporting innovative products such as seed oil and Mahua Jam to Arab countries.

In many parts of Bihar, such as villages in the district of Siwan, the flowers of mahua tree are sun-dried; these sun-dried flowers are ground to flour and used to make various kinds of breads.

Literature
Wine prepared from Madhūka flowers (Madhuca longifolia) finds mention in several Hindu, Jain and Buddhist literature works. It also finds mention in  Ayurveda Samhitas which lists it among several different kinds of wine.

Sacred tree
Madhūka tree is the sacred tree of various temples in South India, including Irumbai Mahaleswarar Temple, Iluppaipattu Neelakandeswarar Temple, Tirukkodimaada Senkundrur at Tiruchengode, and Thiruvanathapuram. The Tamil saint-philosopher Valluvar is believed to have born under an iluppai tree within the Ekambareshwarar Temple at Mylapore, and hence madhūka remains the sanctum tree of the Valluvar shrine built within the Ekambareshwarar temple complex.

Mahua Oil
Average oil Content: 32.92 to 57.53% 
 Refractive index: 1.452
 Fatty acid composition (acid, %) : palmitic (c16:0) : 24.5, stearic (c18:0) : 22.7, oleic (c18:1) : 37.0, linoleic (c18:2) : 14.3
 Elements : Carbon (C), Calcium (Ca), Nitrogen (N), Magnesium (Mg), Phosphorus (P), Sodium (Na) 

Trifed, a website of the Ministry of Tribal Affairs, Government of India reports:
"Mahua oil has emollient properties and is used in skin disease, rheumatism and headache. It is also a laxative and considered useful in habitual constipation, piles and haemorrhoids and as an emetic. Native tribes also used it as an illuminant and hair fixer."

It has also been used as biodiesel.

Other names
 Other botanical names:  Bassia longifolia L., B. latifolia Roxb., Madhuca indica J. F. Gmel., M. latifolia (Roxb.) J.F.Macbr., Illipe latifolia (Roxb.) F.Muell., Illipe malabrorum (Engl.) Note: the authentic genus Bassia is in the Chenopodiaceae. The names B. longifolia and B. latifolia are illegitimate.
 Varieties:
 M. longifolia var. latifolia (Roxb.) A.Chev. (=B. latifolia (Roxb))
 M. longifolia var. longifolia
 Vernacular names:
Santali:matkom
Bengali:mohua
Oriya:"Mahula" "ମହୂଲ"
English: honey tree, butter tree
French: illipe, arbre à beurre, bassie, madhuca
India: moha, mohua, madhuca, kuligam, madurgam, mavagam, nattiluppai, tittinam, mahwa, mahua, mowa, moa, mowrah, mahuda (Gujarati-મહુડા) 
Marathi: "Mahu" and "muvda" in Pawari local tribal lang (Nandurbar, Maharashtra). / "Moha"
Rajasthan: "dolma" in mevadi and marwari
Sri Lanka: මී mee in Sinhala
Tamil: iluppai (இலுப்பை),
Telugu: vippa (విప్ప),
Myanmar: ကမ်းဇော်

Different views and aspects of M. longifolia var. latifolia

References

External links

Alternative edible oil from mahua seeds, The Hindu
Mowrah Butter, OilsByNature.com
 Famine Foods
Use of Mahua Oil (Madhuca indica) as a Diesel Fuel Extender
WWF India Mahua
 "What foods did your ancestors love?" Video of presentation by Aparna Pallavi at TEDxCapeTownWomen, with mahua being the central example of a common indigenous food source overlooked by the dominant society.

Bibliography
Boutelje, J. B. 1980. Encyclopedia of world timbers, names and technical literature.
Duke, J. A. 1989. Handbook of Nuts. CRC Press.
Encke, F. et al. 1993. Zander: Handwörterbuch der Pflanzennamen, 14. Auflage.
Govaerts, R. & D. G. Frodin. 2001. World checklist and bibliography of Sapotaceae.
Hara, H. et al. 1978–1982. An enumeration of the flowering plants of Nepal.
Matthew, K. M. 1983. The flora of the Tamil Nadu Carnatic.
McGuffin, M. et al., eds. 2000. Herbs of commerce, ed. 2.
Nasir, E. & S. I. Ali, eds. 1970–. Flora of [West] Pakistan.
Pennington, T. D. 1991. The genera of the Sapotaceae.
Porcher, M. H. et al. Searchable World Wide Web Multilingual Multiscript Plant Name Database (MMPND) - on-line resource.
Saldanha, C. J. & D. H. Nicolson. 1976. Flora of Hassan district.
Saldanha, C. J. 1985–. Flora of Karnataka.

longifolia
Flora of the Indian subcontinent
Non-timber forest products